Ernesto Allason (Turin, 1822 – March 1, 1868) was an Italian painter.

Biography
He was initially trained as a lawyer, but by 1843, he was studying art under the direction of the painter Carlo Piacenza.  He specialized in landscapes. He was the tutor in arts to the Princess Margherita of Savoy, and was awarded the Cross of Order of Saints Maurice and Lazarus by the King. Ernesto Bertea was one of his pupils.

Sources

1822 births
1868 deaths
Painters from Turin
19th-century Italian painters
Italian male painters
19th-century Italian male artists